A Liturgy, a Legacy, & a Ragamuffin Band is the seventh album by American singer and songwriter Rich Mullins, released in 1993. The album was very well received, and received the third place in the book CCM Presents: The 100 Greatest Albums in Christian Music (2001).

"A Liturgy, a Legacy, & a Ragamuffin Band" is an example of a concept album, as stated in the liner notes by Mullins and album producer Reed Arvin: 
Cuts 2–6 of this album loosely follow the pattern of a liturgy - a tool used for collective worship. In it there is proclamation, praise, confession of sin, affirmation of faith and celebration of grace. 
Cuts 7–12 are a consideration of our "secular" heritage, issues and ideas that play themselves out in the history of our country. 

"How to Grow Up Big and Strong" was recorded in honor of its writer, singer Mark Heard, who died in 1992.

Track listing
 "Here in America" (Rich Mullins) – 3:57
Appeared on compilation Songs 2 1999
 "52:10" (Rich Mullins) – 3:45
 "The Color Green" (Rich Mullins) – 5:41
 "Hold Me Jesus" (Rich Mullins) – 3:06
Appeared on compilation Songs 1996
 "Creed" (Rich Mullins, Beaker) – 5:24
Appeared on compilation Songs 1996
 "Peace (A Communion Blessing from St. Joseph's Square)" (Rich Mullins, Beaker) – 5:23
Appeared on compilation Songs 2 1999
 "78 Eatonwood Green" (Rich Mullins, Beaker) – 2:22
 "Hard" (Rich Mullins) – 3:51
 "I'll Carry On" (Rich Mullins, Beaker) – 3:53
 "You Gotta Get Up (Christmas Song)" (Rich Mullins) – 2:37
 "How to Grow Up Big and Strong" (Mark Heard) – 5:31
 "Land of My Sojourn" (Rich Mullins, Beaker) – 4:03

Personnel 

 Rich Mullins – lead vocals, hammered dulcimer, acoustic piano
 Reed Arvin – keyboards, acoustic piano
 Lee Lundgren – keyboards, squeezebox, hooter, organ
 Jimmy Abegg – acoustic guitar, electric guitar, mandolin
 Rick Elias – acoustic guitar, electric guitar
 Billy Crockett – acoustic guitar
 Beaker – lap dulcimer
 Danny O'Lannerty – acoustic bass guitar, electric bass
 Chris McHugh – drums
 Eric Darken – assorted drums, various percussions
 Judson Spence – backing vocals
 Michael Mellett – backing vocals
 Linda Elias – backing vocals
 Nicki Lundgren – backing vocals
 Jarrod Brown – backing vocals

Honorary Ragamuffins
 Mark Baldwin
 George Cocchini
 Matt Pierson 
 Sam Levine

Production

 Reed Arvin – producer, additional engineer
 Don Donohue – A&R 
 Tom Laune – recording, mixing
 Shane D. Wilson – second engineer, mix assistant 
 Bob Clark – string engineer
 Julee Brand – production manager 
 Buddy Jackson – art direction
 D. L. Rhodes – art direction
 Jackson Design – art direction, design 
 Beth Lee – design
 Pinebrook Recording Studio, Alexandria, Indiana – recording studio
 The Bennett House, Franklin, Tennessee – recording studio
 Skylab Studios, Nashville, Tennessee – recording studio

Charts

References 

Rich Mullins albums
1993 albums
Albums produced by Reed Arvin